Mikhaylovskaya is a rural locality (a village) in Nikolskoye Rural Settlement, Kaduysky District, Vologda Oblast, Russia. The population was 16 as of 2002.

Geography 
Mikhaylovskaya is located 33 km north of Kaduy (the district's administrative centre) by road. Tsipelevo is the nearest rural locality.

References 

Rural localities in Kaduysky District